This list of fictional arthropods is subsidiary to the list of fictional animals. It is restricted to notable insect, arachnid and crustacean characters from the world of fiction.

Literature

Comics

Legends

Media

Film

Television

Animation

Video games
{|class="wikitable sortable"
!Character
!Species
!Work
!Notes
|-
|Buck Bumble
|Bee
|Buck Bumble (N64)
|
|-
|Contessa
|Black widow spider
|Sly 2: Band of Thieves
|While the majority of her is a black widow spider, she has the upper body of a human and the pincers of a scorpion as well.
|-
|Charmy
|Bee
|Sonic the Hedgehog
| is a bee who is the "scatter-brained funny-kid" of the Chaotix. He is cheerful, curious, playful, careless, and greatly energetic, often talking about things no one else cares about. Charmy's fooling around makes the rest of the detective agency staff look professional, and he is generally seen as a "cute mascot".  Despite an innocent, good-natured and light-hearted personality, he uses his stinging tail on rare occasions that he gets angry. In addition being a playable character in Sonic Heroes and Shadow the Hedgehog, he made cameos in both Mario and Sonic at the Olympic Games installments as a referee.
|-
|King Zing
|Bee
|Donkey Kong Country
| is the giant king of the Zingers, fought in the Krazy Kremland level in Donkey Kong Country 2: Diddy's Kong Quest as the game's third boss, and the same level in Donkey Kong Land 2 as the fifth boss.
|-
|Moskito
|Mosquito
|Rayman
|Moskito is a giant mosquito, fought in the Moskito's Nest level, the last of the Dream Forest's levels, in Rayman as the game's first boss.
|-
|Murfy
|Greenbottle
|Rayman
|Murfy is a greenbottle who appeared for the first time in the video game Rayman 2: The Great Escape, where he is nicknamed the "flying encyclopaedia". He has a hasty nature and he appears bored with his job.
|-
|Queen B.
|Bee
|Donkey Kong Country
|Queen B. is the giant queen of the Zingers, fought in the Bumble B Rumble level in Donkey Kong Country as the game's third boss.
|-
|Queen Bee
|Bee
|Mario
|Queen Bee is the queen of the Honeyhive Galaxy and the Honeyhop Galaxy in Super Mario Galaxy and Super Mario Galaxy 2. She is an extremely large Bee who is the rightful ruler of the Worker Bees. She also appeared in Mario Kart 7 as an unlockable racer, being one of the heaviest characters in the game.
|-
|Roger Samms
|Cockroach
|Bad Mojo
|An entomologist with his soul and mind transferred into the body of cockroach and is forced to travel through the dangerous dilapidated bar he lives in.
|-
|Zapper
|Cricket
|Zapper: One Wicked Cricket
|A pretty mean and manipulative cricket, who uses his little grub brother as a TV aerial.
|-
|ShLep
|Fly
|My Singing Monsters`
|A Dreamythical monster with "Lucky Charms" inside. When its verse plays, it jiggles around. Generating an "Ekpiri Rattle" Sound.
|}

Other
Bee – a bee Suzy's ZooBuzz Bee – a bee mascot from Honey Nut Cheerios cereal
Bee – a mythical creature
Buzz – a bee mascot for the Georgia Institute of Technology
Flooty – a butterfly in Suzy's ZooEmmet – a heraldic beast
Loopy – a bee mascot from Honey Loops cereal
Mundi - a ladybug from Doki
Jollibee – a red bee who is the mascot of the fast-food company of the same name.
Tickle – a ladybug Suzy's ZooZoom Zoom – a grasshopper Suzy's ZooEndermite – a silverfish-related arthropod from Minecraft''

See also
List of films featuring anthropomorphic insects

References

Arthropods